Mand Sangojla  is a village in Kapurthala district of Punjab State, India. The village is administrated by a Sarpanch, who is an elected representative.

Demography 
According to the report published by Census India in 2011, Mand Sangojla has 76 houses with the total population of 419 persons of which 228 are male and 191 females. Literacy rate of  Mand Sangojla is 63.93%, lower than the state average of 75.84%.  The population of children in the age group 0–6 years is 53 which is 12.65% of the total population. Child sex ratio is approximately 710, lower than the state average of 846.

As per census 2011, 135 people were engaged in work activities out of the total population of Mand Sangojla which includes 123 males and 12 females. According to census survey report 2011, 92.59% workers describe their work as main work and 7.41% workers are involved in Marginal activity providing livelihood for less than 6 months.

Population data

Caste  
The village has schedule caste (SC) constitutes 67.06% of total population of the village and it doesn't have any Schedule Tribe (ST) population.

References

External links
  Villages in Kapurthala
 Kapurthala Villages List

Populated places in Punjab, India
Villages in Kapurthala district